The Council of Europe Convention on Action Against Trafficking in Human Beings is a regional human rights treaty of international human rights law by the Council of Europe. The Convention aims to: 
 prevent and combat all forms of human trafficking, including, but not limited to sexual exploitation and forced labour, whether national or transnational, whether or not connected with organised crime;
 to protect and assist victims and witnesses of trafficking;
 to ensure effective investigation and prosecution, and
 to promote international co-operation against trafficking.

In particular, the Convention requires national co-ordination measures, awareness raising, measures to identify and support victims and a "recovery and reflection period" during which trafficked persons will not be expelled from the receiving state.

The Convention establishes a monitoring mechanism (the Group of Experts on Action against Trafficking in Human Beings, or GRETA) consisting of 10 to 15 members elected by the states parties.

The Convention opened for signature on 16 May 2005, and entered into force on 1 February 2008. As of June 2017, it has been ratified by 47 European states. Every state in the Council of Europe has ratified the treaty except the Russian Federation.Belarus, a non–Council of Europe state, acceded to the convention in 2013.
The Convention is also recalled by the Convention on preventing and combating violence against women and domestic violence.

In 2021, it was reported that Israel, a non-Council of Europe state, will join the convention, making it the first country outside of Europe to join.

See also
Protocol to Prevent, Suppress and Punish Trafficking in Persons, especially Women and Children

References

External links
 Council of Europe - Action against Trafficking in Human Beings

Council of Europe treaties
Treaties concluded in 2005
Treaties entered into force in 2008
Treaties of Albania
Treaties of Andorra
Treaties of Armenia
Treaties of Austria
Treaties of Azerbaijan
Treaties of Belarus
Treaties of Belgium
Treaties of Bosnia and Herzegovina
Treaties of Bulgaria
Treaties of Croatia
Treaties of Cyprus
Treaties of Denmark
Treaties of Estonia
Treaties of Finland
Treaties of France
Treaties of Georgia (country)
Treaties of Germany
Treaties of Greece
Treaties of Hungary
Treaties of Iceland
Treaties of Ireland
Treaties of Italy
Treaties of Latvia
Treaties of Liechtenstein
Treaties of Lithuania
Treaties of Luxembourg
Treaties of Malta
Treaties of Moldova
Treaties of Montenegro
Treaties of the Netherlands
Treaties of Norway
Treaties of Poland
Treaties of Portugal
Treaties of Romania
Treaties of San Marino
Treaties of Serbia
Treaties of Slovakia
Treaties of Slovenia
Treaties of Spain
Treaties of Sweden
Treaties of Switzerland
Treaties of North Macedonia
Treaties of Ukraine
Treaties of the United Kingdom
2005 in Poland
Human trafficking treaties